Tony Hoffer is an American record producer, songwriter, and music mixer.

Career
Hoffer is credited for his work on multiple platinum-selling albums including The Kooks, The Thrills, Beck, Supergrass, Turin Brakes and Air. His records have been nominated for 7 Grammys and British Mercury Prize Awards for his work with Beck, M83, Chromeo, Silversun Pickups, Depeche Mode and The Thrills.

Hoffer is most noted for his production and mixing of albums by Beck, The Fratellis (debuted at #2 in UK charts on 11 Sep 06), The Kooks (one of the top-selling UK albums in 2006), M83, Belle & Sebastian, Fitz and the Tantrums and Air. Hoffer has also worked with Fischerspooner, Grandaddy, the French group Phoenix, Suede, Sondre Lerche, Turin Brakes and Canadian-Irish band Romes.

Selected production/mix credits

 1999: Midnite Vultures by Beck
 2001: 10 000 Hz Legend by Air
 2002: Life on Other Planets by Supergrass
 2003: So Much for the City by The Thrills
 2003: Ether Song by Turin Brakes
 2004: Alphabetical by Phoenix
 2004: Set Yourself On Fire by Stars
 2005: Guero by Beck
 2006: The Life Pursuit by Belle & Sebastian
 2006: Carnavas by Silversun Pickups
 2006: Costello Music by The Fratellis
 2006: The Truth by La Rocca
 2006: Inside In/Inside Out by The Kooks
 2007: "Berlin" (single mix) by Black Rebel Motorcycle Club (from Baby 81)
 2007: Phantom Punch by Sondre Lerche
 2007: Matinee by Jack Peñate
 2007: Hourglass by Dave Gahan
 2008: Konk by The Kooks
 2008: Seventh Tree by Goldfrapp
 2008: Ladyhawke by Ladyhawke
 2009: Sounds of the Universe by Depeche Mode
 2009: Swoon by Silversun Pickups
 2010: Write About Love by Belle & Sebastian
 2011: "I Would Do Anything for You" by Foster The People (from Torches)
 2011: Junk of the Heart by The Kooks
 2011: Hurry Up, We're Dreaming by M83
 2011: Good & Evil by Tally Hall
 2013: More Than Just a Dream by Fitz and the Tantrums
 2013: "I Won't Let You Down" by OK Go (from Hungry Ghosts)
 2014: Be Impressive by The Griswolds
 2014: High Noon by The Arkells
 2015: My Type by Saint Motel
 2015: Eyes Wide, Tongue Tied by The Fratellis
 2015: Smile by The Royal Concept
 2016: Junk by M83
 2016: Believe EP by ROMES
 2016: KIN by KT Tunstall
 2017: ROMES by ROMES
 2018: In Your Own Sweet Time by The Fratellis
 2018: Art of Doubt by Metric
 2018: Magic by Ben Rector
 2018: Shake the Spirit by Elle King
 2018: Head Over Heels by Chromeo
 2019: The Cure To Loneliness by Jai Wolf
 2019: Rebel Girl (Angels & Airwaves song) by Angels & Airwaves
 2019: Kiss & Tell (Angels & Airwaves song) by Angels & Airwaves
 2019: DSVII by M83
 2020: Lonely Generation by Echosmith
 2020: Friends in the Corner by Foxes
 2020: Bum Bum by Dirty Heads
 2020: Mixtape EP by The Snuts
 2021: Bodies (album) by AFI
 2021: Half Drunk Under A Full Moon by The Fratellis
 2021: W.L. (album) by The Snuts
 2022: 40 oz. to Fresno by Joyce Manor
 2022: Work Out by Rainbow Kitten Surprise
 2022: Across That Fine Line by Nation of Language
 2022: 40 oz. to Fresno by Joyce Manor
 2022: Formentera by Metric (band)

External links
 

Record producers from Tennessee
American audio engineers
Living people
Year of birth missing (living people)